Aquamania is a 1961 American animated Goofy cartoon produced by Walt Disney Productions and released by Buena Vista Distribution on December 20, 1961.

This cartoon was the last from Disney's "Golden Era" which featured Goofy as a solo star, and the first time the xerography animation-technique was used in a Goofy cartoon. Aquamania basically combined Goofy's three familiar areas in his career: sports, fatherhood, and documentary-subject.

Plot
The story begins with a narrator explaining a case study of "aquamania" (obsession with boats and boating), with Goofy (called "Mr. X" in this short) as the subject. Then the story switches to Goofy and his son on a boating trip, inadvertently entering a water skiing race. In the process, Goofy meets up with an unfortunate octopus that joins him in the race, and they accidentally take an unwanted spin on a roller coaster at a waterside amusement park which plays the song Sailing, Sailing. Goofy wins the race.

Voice cast
Pinto Colvig as Goofy (Mr. X)
Kevin Corcoran as Goofy Jr.
John Dehner as Narrator/Race announcer

Home media
The short was released on December 2, 2002, on Walt Disney Treasures: The Complete Goofy.

References

External links
 

1961 films
1960s Disney animated short films
Goofy (Disney) short films
1961 animated films
Films scored by Buddy Baker (composer)
Short films directed by Wolfgang Reitherman
Films produced by Walt Disney
1961 short films
1960s English-language films